CINI-FM is a First Nations community radio station that operates at 95.3 FM in Mistissini, Quebec, Canada.

References

External links
Official website

Ini
Ini
Radio stations established in 1990
1990 establishments in Quebec